The list of ship decommissionings in 2010 includes a chronological list of ships decommissioned in 2010.


See also

References

2010
Ship